Auburn High School, formerly Auburn Senior High School, is a public high school in Auburn, Washington, United States, founded in 1903. Its campus includes the Auburn Performing Arts Center (PAC), the Auburn School District Swimming Pool, Auburn Memorial Stadium (also known as Troy Field), tennis courts, softball field and baseball field. Beginning with the 2014-2015 school year, staff and students will move into the new Auburn High School located at 711 East Main Street in Auburn. Construction of the new school building began on February 24, 2013, following the November 2012 Bond Election, in which Auburn District voters authorized the selling of bonds to fund the new high school building. The entire school, with the exception of the PAC and the auto shop building, was replaced.

Academics
Auburn offers Advanced Placement classes in biology, calculus, language and composition, literature and composition, Spanish, U.S. history, European history and U.S. politics and government. Three foreign languages are taught – French, Spanish, and Chinese – up to the 7/8 (4th year) level.

International Thespian Society
Auburn High School is a member of the Washington State chapter of the International Thespian Society as Troupe 17. This was the earliest troupe of acting students established in Washington state with a High School, in 1929.

Notable alumni
Nate Cohn, political journalist for the New York Times The Upshot.
Cam Gigandet (Class of 2001), actor who appeared in Twilight and Burlesque
 Christine Gregoire, 22nd Governor of Washington
Kevin Hagen, former MLB player (St. Louis Cardinals)
Gordon Hirabayashi (Class of 1937), civil rights activist who challenged the legality of the internment of Japanese Americans during World War II
Chris Lukezic, professional middle-distance runner sponsored by Reebok
Evan McMullin, 2016 candidate for United States president backed by Better for America
Blair Rasmussen (Class of 1981), NBA basketball player, Denver Nuggets (1985–1991) Atlanta Hawks (1991–1993)
Francis R. "Dick" Scobee, Space Shuttle Challenger astronaut
 Danny Shelton, NFL football player, drafted by the Cleveland Browns (2015–17). New England Patriots (2018–present). Super Bowl Champion (LIII)
 Minoru Yamasaki, designer of the World Trade Center buildings destroyed on September 11, 2001

Athletics
Auburn moved to the South Puget Sound League (SPSL) 3A in fall 2006. After only two years in the SPSL 3A Auburn, along with Auburn Riverside, moved to back to 4A in fall 2008. Auburn became part of the SPSL-North, returning to the same league they left after 2005.  Auburn joined the Olympic Division of the newly resurrected North Puget Sound League in 2016.

Sports offered at Auburn are:

 Boys' tennis
 Boys' water polo
 Cross country
 American football
 Girls' soccer
 Girls' swimming/diving
 Golf
 Volleyball
 Boys' basketball
 Boys' swimming/diving
 Girls' swimming/diving
 Girls' basketball
 Girls' water polo
 Gymnastics
 Wrestling
 Baseball
 Boys' soccer
 Girls' fastpitch
 Girls' tennis
 Girls' water polo
 Track and field
 FIRST Robotics Competition

Auburn High School has a sports medicine program.''

References

High schools in King County, Washington
Buildings and structures in Auburn, Washington
South Puget Sound League
Educational institutions established in 1903
Public high schools in Washington (state)
1903 establishments in Washington (state)